Jimmy Wallington was an American radio personality.

After playing small roles in a few Hollywood films, he was the announcer for several popular radio shows in the 1940s and 1950s.

For his work on radio, Wallington has a star on the Hollywood Walk of Fame at 6660 Hollywood Blvd.

Biography
Wallington was the announcer for several popular radio shows in the 1930s, 1940s and 1950s, including Texaco Star Theatre with Fred Allen (1941–44) and Texaco Town with Eddie Cantor. As with most announcers, Wallington would announce the program's star, then read the sponsor's commercials.  In addition, he was often given comedy lines.  When radio shows moved to television, he continued as a television announcer in the 1950s. (see the Filmography section)

After years as a radio announcer, he became a TV star in California doing Life Insurance and other commercials. He ended his professional radio career as a Voice of America radio announcer in the Worldwide English service.

Filmography

Movies
Joe Palooka in Triple Cross (1951) .... Himself
Hollywood Stadium Mystery (1938) .... Nick Nichols
Start Cheering (1938) .... Announcer

Radio
 During August 1934 toured, with the Three X Sisters, Mary Small, and other entertainers, as NBC radio personality at the famous Steel Pier music hot spot.
The Alan Young Show ... himself - announcer 
The Big Show (1950–1951) .... Himself - Announcer
The Life of Riley (1949–1951) .... Himself - Announcer
Screen Director's Playhouse (1949–1951) .... Himself - Announcer
Stranger Than Fiction (1934–1939) .... Himself - Announcer
The Fred Allen Show (1940s) .... Himself - Announcer
The Martin and Lewis Show (1949–51) . . . Himself - Announcer
Announcer NBC radio mid-1930s   
https://www.myspace.com/my/photos/photo/22962106/  Jimmy Wallington radio NBC

Television
Panic (1958) .... Radio Announcer (1 episode)
Toast of the Town (1955) .... Himself (1 episode)
This Is Your Life (1954) .... Himself (1 episode)
The Colgate Comedy Hour (1951–1953) .... Himself - Announcer

References

External links

American radio personalities
People from Rochester, New York
Year of birth missing
Year of death missing
Radio and television announcers